Eugnosta ensinoana is a species of moth of the family Tortricidae. It is found in Mexico (Tamaulipas).

The wingspan is 10–12 mm. The ground colour of the forewings is pale ochreous cream suffused with brownish yellow, especially in the basal third of the wing. The hindwings are pale brown.

Etymology
The species name refers to El Ensino, the type locality.

References

Moths described in 2007
Eugnosta